Emil Georg Bührle (31 August 1890 in Pforzheim – November 26, 1956 in Zürich) was a controversial German arms manufacturer, art collector and patron who emigrated to Switzerland. His art collection is now housed in the Foundation E.G. Bührle.

Early life 
Born in Pforzheim, Germany, Bührle studied philosophy, literature, history and art history in Freiburg before moving to Munich. From 1914 to 1919 he was a German cavalry officer in the imperial army. In 1919 he joined the Magdeburg Machine and Tool Factory (Magdeburg Werkzeugmaschinenfabrik) and rose up to become a legal representative. The Magdeburger Werkzeugmaschinenfabrik bought the Swiss Machine Tool Factory Oerlikon (Werkzeugmaschinenfabrik Oerlikon) in 1923, and Bührle became the CEO the following year. In 1924 he moved to Zurich. In 1929, Bührle became the majority shareholder of the Werkzeugmaschinenfabrik Oerlikon and in 1936 he became the sole owner of the company (later the Oerlikon-Bührle Holding AG). In 1937, Bührle obtained Swiss citizenship.

During the Second World War Bührle became Switzerland's richest man by supplying weapons to Nazi Germany.

From his 1920 marriage with Charlotte Schalk came two children. The following foundations are attributed to Emil Bührle: Emil Bührle Foundation for the Swiss literature (1943), Goethe Foundation for Art and Science (1944) and the Foundation of the cultivation of the Kunsthaus Zürich (1954).

Industrialist

Bührle's role as an industrialist has been controversial in recent decades because of his ties to Nazis. Although he converted the almost bankrupt Werkzeugmaschinenfabrik Oerlikon into a thriving company, his main business became arms production and export. Before the second world war the Oerlikon-Bührle company supplied the Republicans in Spain (i.e. Franco opponents), the independent Abyssinia (in the colonial war against fascist Italy), and several Baltic countries, Czechoslovakia, Greece, China, Turkey, France, Holland and Britain. In the period from 1940 to 1944, with Switzerland then completely surrounded by fascist countries (Italy, Germany) and fascist-occupied countries (Austria, France), and at the request of the Swiss government, the company supplied weapons to Germany and Italy. In the post-war years, Emil Bührle and the Oerlikon-Bührle company were involved in illegal weapons deals on a large-scale, smuggling arms to Hyderabad, Pakistan and other countries.

Art collector
Bührle's first acquisitions were two 1920 watercolours by Erich Heckel, followed in 1924 by a picture of Maurice de Vlaminck. The present day make up of the Bührle collection started in 1936, when financial conditions were very favourable.

Nazi-era acquisitions
The American Office of Strategic Services Art Looting Investigation Unit Reports 1945-46, state that during the Nazi era, Bührle was an "important recipient of looted works of art by purchase from Fischer and Wendland".

Between 1940 and 1944 Emil Georg Bührle's arms dealing increased his fortune from 140,000 to 127,000,000 Swiss Francs (roughly $6 billion in 2015 U.S. dollars), which he used for art-buying sprees in Nazi-occupied Paris, forming the core of his collection. Bührle bought many artworks through the dealers Siegfried Rosengart, Fritz Nathan and Toni Aktuaryus as well as other dealers.

Post-War
After World War II, Bührle continued to be advised by Fritz Nathan, a gallery owner, and a small circle of international dealers in Paris, London and New York City, in addition to which included Georges Wildenstein, Paul Rosenberg, and Frank Lloyd of the Marlborough Gallery.

The collection includes medieval sculptures and old masters, mainly French Impressionism and classical modernism, including masterpieces by Paul Cézanne (The Boy in the Red Vest), Pierre-Auguste Renoir (La petite Irène) and Vincent van Gogh (The Sower (after Millet)).

Bührle continued the tradition of collectors in Germany, Scandinavia, Britain and the US, who—before the First World War and in the inter-war years—centred their interest on French modernism. An example of this trend in Switzerland is the "Am Römerholz" collection by Oskar Reinhart in nearby Winterthur. Two-thirds of the collection now displayed were acquired in 1960 by the heirs to the E.G. Bührle Foundation, and later put on display. The other family-owned works of art were often shown in exhibitions. An exhibition featuring several works of the collection in 1990 in Washington D.C. led to protests and discussions in the media due to Bührle's role as a weapons exporter in the Second World War and the sometimes unclear origin of the pictures, some of which were formerly Jewish-owned. Following the findings of an "Independent Commission of Swiss Second World War Experts", Bührle had to return 13 paintings of French-Jewish origin to their former owners or their second-generation descendants.

In 2021 an extension to the Kunsthaus in Zürich, Switzerland's largest art museum, opened, with almost an entire floor dedicated to  paintings and sculptures on 20-year loan from the Bührle Foundation. This drew criticism due to Bührle's Nazi-era weapons dealings, and his use of forced labour and child labour in his factories at the time. Up to 90 of the works loaned to the Kunsthaus are thought possibly to have been acquired illegitimately from Jews; historian Erich Keller said "We need independent research into the art's provenances, and then consider which of these paintings really belong in the Kunsthaus and which need to be given back." The Bührle Foundation's director responded that "The approximately 90 works are works for which no complete provenance is known, but for which there is also no reason to assume a problematic provenance".

Further reading
Provenance research by the Emil Bührle Collection, Zurich, 2002–2021 Christen, Ruedi: Die Bührle-Saga. Zürich 1981 
Esther Tisa Francini, Anja Heuss, Georg Kreis: Fluchtgut – Raubgut. Der Transfer von Kulturgütern in und über die Schweiz 1933–1945 und die Frage der Restitution. Zürich 2001 
Gloor, Lukas: Stiftung Sammlung E. G. Bührle: Katalog I–III. Silvana 2004–2005,  (1),  (2),  (3).
Gloor, Lukas: Bührle collection : Impressionist masterpieces from the E.G.Buehrle collection, Zurich (Switzerland). Tokyo: The National Art Center (2018). .
Heller, Daniel: Zwischen Unternehmertum, Politik und Überleben. Emil G. Bührle und die Werkzeugmaschinenfabrik Oerlikon, Bührle & Co. 1924–1945. Frauenfeld, Stuttgart & Wien 2002 
Hug, Peter: Schweizer Rüstungsindustrie und Kriegsmaterialhandel zur Zeit des Nationalsozialismus: Unternehmensstrategien – Marktentwicklung – politische Überwachung. Zürich 2002 
Katalog Washington D.C.: The Passionate Eye, Impressionist and other Master Paintings from the E. G. Bührle Collection. Zürich 1990 
Emil Maurer: Stiftung Sammlung E. G. Bührle, Zürich. Bern 1992

References

External links
 Official Foundation E.G. Bührle Website in German and in English

1890 births
1956 deaths
20th-century Swiss businesspeople
Swiss philanthropists
Swiss art collectors
German emigrants to Switzerland